The Horten H.XIII was an experimental flying wing aircraft designed by the Horten brothers during World War II.

Design
The H.XIIIa was an unpowered glider with wings swept backwards at 60°. It was a technology demonstrator to examine the low speed handling of highly swept wings, for the development of a jet fighter which was expected to exceed Mach 1, the H.XIIIb.

Specifications (H.XIIIa)

References

Further reading
 

Flying wings
1940s German sailplanes
H13
Glider aircraft
Aircraft first flown in 1944